Caselex is a unique legal information service opening up national case law and other important decisions (like those of competition authorities) with a European connotation to legal professions. As such it contributes to the Europeanisation of law. Relying on a network of editors throughout Europe, Caselex systematically summarizes in English case law and other decisions that have a cross border value to legal professionals. The service consists of the Caselex Market Definitions Module and several Case Law Modules.

Caselex history 
Caselex was launched as a project financed by the EU Commission in 2005 (Programme IS-ECONTENT - Multiannual Community programme to stimulate the development and use of European digital content on the global networks and to promote linguistic diversity in the Information Society 2001-2005, Grant agreement ID: 11218). It was founded by Stig Marthinsen, with Marc de Vries as project technical coordinator. Stig Marthinsen left the firme in 2011.

Caselex Market Definitions Module 
Defining relevant markets is crucial in concentration control and antitrust cases. The Caselex Market Definitions Module gives user friendly access to English summaries of relevant markets definitions of concentration control decisions rendered by all 34 national and European competition authorities (29 EU Member States, 4 EFTA countries and  DG COMP of the European Commission) since 2000 up to today.

Accordingly, by giving an instant synoptic European-wide overview of all relevant markets defined it provides support to lawyers submitting notifications and to competition authorities responsible for concentration control under the EU 2004 Merger Control Regulation as well as national rules thereon. Each product market is searchable on the basis of names of products and NACE codes and each definition backed up by the line of reasoning of the competition authority. Full texts of original decision are also available and downloadable in PDF.

Currently (October 2015), the database holds over 3.500 national and 900 DG COMP decisions holding more than 10.000 market definitions. The launch of this Module is foreseen in January 2016.

Caselex Case Law Modules 
Next to that Caselex covers important national case law from all EU Member States Caselex (next to case law from the European Court of Justice). Well structured English summaries allow for instant access to and full understanding of case law that would otherwise not travel across Europe. Currently (October 2015) the Modules hold almost 5.000 summaries covering the following areas of law:
 Competition Law
 Employment Law
 Public procurement Law
 ICT and Media Law
 Social Security Law

See also 
 Law of the European Union
 Europeanisation of law
 EUR-Lex
 Harmonisation of law

External links 
 Caselex' official homepage (under construction)

Sources 
 NRC Handelsblad (http://www.nrc.nl/), "Caselex: googelen voor eurojuristen", 14.2.2008

Online law databases
European Union law
Case law databases